Matthew Thomas Fitzpatrick (born 1 September 1994) is an English  professional golfer. After winning the 2013 U.S. Amateur, he later won his first professional tournament at the 2015 British Masters. In 2022 he won his first major championship and his first PGA Tour event at the U.S. Open.

Early life
Fitzpatrick was born in Sheffield and attended Tapton School where he sat A-levels in 2013. He is a keen football fan and a lifelong supporter of local club Sheffield United. His younger brother Alex played college golf at Wake Forest University in North Carolina. Alex played in the 2019 and 2021 Walker Cup and turned professional in 2022.

Amateur career
Fitzpatrick won the 2012 Boys Amateur Championship at Notts Golf Club (Hollinwell). He made the cut at the 2013 Open Championship and finished as low amateur, winning The Silver Medal. Fitzpatrick and Jimmy Mullen were the only amateurs to make the cut, with Fitzpatrick finishing on 294 to Mullen's 299. Later in 2013, Fitzpatrick won the U.S. Amateur, which earned him invitations to the 2014 Masters Tournament, U.S. Open, and Open Championship provided he remained an amateur. The U.S. Amateur win took him to the top of the World Amateur Golf Ranking which earned him the Mark H. McCormack Medal. In September 2013 he played in the Walker Cup.

In September 2013 Fitzpatrick enrolled at Northwestern University to play college golf with the Northwestern Wildcats; however he left after one quarter, in January 2014, to pursue a full-time amateur golf career. He played in five tournaments for Northwestern in the autumn of 2013. He was the co-champion of the Rod Myers Invitational at Duke University to lead Northwestern to the team title, and also recorded a third place finish at the Windon Memorial Classic to help Northwestern win the tournament. He recorded finishes of 53rd, 23rd, and 15th in his other three tournaments.

Professional career
Fitzpatrick turned professional after the 2014 U.S. Open, forfeiting his exemption to the 2014 Open Championship. His professional debut was at the 2014 Irish Open, after which he played several competitions on the European Tour and Challenge Tour on sponsor and tournament invitations.

In November 2014, Fitzpatrick entered the 2014 European Tour Qualifying School where he finished in 11th place and qualified for the 2015 European Tour.

Fitzpatrick started the 2015 season missing six cuts in the first eight competitions on the season; in June, he registered a third place at the Lyoness Open quickly followed, in July 2015, by second place at the Omega European Masters a shot behind Danny Willett, winning the second prize of €300,000. His maiden victory came in October 2015, when he won the British Masters at Woburn, winning the first prize of £500,000 (€671,550). After this result, he entered the world top 100 for the first time with a ranking of 59. He finished his rookie season on tour with one win, nine top-10 placements, and a 12th place in the final Order of Merit.

In April 2016, Fitzpatrick competed at the 2016 Masters Tournament, finishing tied for the 7th place; in June, he won the 2016 Nordea Masters and reached the 32nd place in the Official World Golf Ranking, his best position to date. Due to his results on the 2015 and 2016 seasons of the European Tour he obtained an automatic selection for the 2016 Ryder Cup.

In November 2016, Fitzpatrick won the DP World Tour Championship, Dubai by one shot over Tyrrell Hatton, for the third win of his career.

In September 2017, Fitzpatrick won the Omega European Masters in Crans-Montana, Switzerland via a playoff victory over Scott Hend and in September 2018, Fitzpatrick successfully defended his European Masters title in a playoff over Lucas Bjerregaard.

In December 2020, Fitzpatrick won his second  DP World Tour Championship, Dubai, beating eventual Race to Dubai champion, Lee Westwood by one shot. The win also marked his first Rolex Series title.

In September 2021, Fitzpatrick played on the European team in the 2021 Ryder Cup at Whistling Straits in Kohler, Wisconsin. The U.S. team won 19–9 and Fitzpatrick went 0–3–0 including a loss in his Sunday singles match against Daniel Berger. Three weeks later, Fitzpatrick won the Estrella Damm N.A. Andalucía Masters at Real Club Valderrama.

In June 2022, he won his first major championship at the U.S. Open, with a one-shot victory at The Country Club in Brookline, Massachusetts – the same venue where he won the U.S. Amateur in 2013. He joined Jack Nicklaus as the second male golfer to win a U.S Open and a U.S. Amateur title at the same venue.

Personal life
Fitzpatrick appears in the sports documentary series Full Swing, which premiered on Netflix on February 15, 2023.

Amateur wins
2012 Boys Amateur Championship
2013 U.S. Amateur

Professional wins (8)

PGA Tour wins (1)

European Tour wins (8)

1Co-sanctioned by the Asian Tour
The 2020 DP World Tour Championship, Dubai was also a Rolex Series tournament.

European Tour playoff record (2–3)

Major championships

Wins (1)

Results timeline
Results not in chronological order in 2020.

LA = Low amateur
CUT = missed the half-way cut
"T" = tied
NT = No tournament due to COVID-19 pandemic

Summary

Most consecutive cuts made – 9 (2020 Masters – 2022 Open Championship, current)
Longest streak of top-10s – 2 (2022 PGA - 2022 U.S. Open)

Results in The Players Championship

CUT = missed the halfway cut
"T" indicates a tie for a place
C = Cancelled after the first round due to the COVID-19 pandemic

Results in World Golf Championships

1Cancelled due to COVID-19 pandemic

QF, R16, R32, R64 = Round in which player lost in match play
NT = No tournament
"T" = Tied
Note that the Championship and Invitational were discontinued from 2022.

Team appearances
Amateur
European Boys' Team Championship (representing England): 2012
Jacques Léglise Trophy (representing Great Britain & Ireland): 2012
Walker Cup (representing Great Britain & Ireland): 2013

Professional
EurAsia Cup (representing Europe): 2016 (winners), 2018 (winners)
Ryder Cup (representing Europe) : 2016, 2021

See also
2014 European Tour Qualifying School graduates
List of golfers with most European Tour wins

References

External links

Northwestern Wildcats profile

English male golfers
Northwestern Wildcats men's golfers
European Tour golfers
PGA Tour golfers
Winners of men's major golf championships
Ryder Cup competitors for Europe
Sportspeople from Sheffield
People educated at Tapton School
1994 births
Living people